Philip Gefter is an American author and photography historian. His books include What Becomes A Legend Most, the biography of Richard Avedon; and Wagstaff: Before and After Mapplethorpe, the biography of Sam Wagstaff, for which he received the 2014 Marfield Prize, the national award for arts writing. He is also the author of George Dureau: The Photographs, and Photography After Frank, a book of essays published by Aperture in 2009. He was on staff at The New York Times for over fifteen years, where he wrote regularly about photography. He produced the 2011 documentary film, Bill Cunningham New York.

Life
Gefter received a fine arts degree from the Pratt Institute in painting and photography. Upon graduation, he took a job as a picture researcher in the Time-Life Picture Collection, which exposed him to the photographs of Walker Evans, Margaret Bourke-White, Robert Capa, W. Eugene Smith, and Alfred Eisenstaedt, among other photographers. Following that, he took a job at Aperture Foundation, where, as assistant editor, he worked on the Aperture History of Photography series and on publications such as Edward Weston: Nudes; America and Lewis Hine; and the re-publication of Robert Frank's The Americans.

In 1982, Henry Geldzahler, then commissioner of cultural affairs for the city of New York, appointed him photography advisor to the Department of Cultural Affairs, where he put together a program of public exhibitions.

From 1992 until 2016, he was on staff at The New York Times as a picture editor, becoming the Page One Picture Editor from 1999 until 2003, and, and, then, as a picture editor in Culture, when he started writing about photography for the paper.

In 2011, he and Richard Press (who were married in 2008) released their feature-length documentary film Bill Cunningham New York, about The New York Times photographer Bill Cunningham.

In 2011, Gefter received a Museum Scholar residency at the Getty Research Institute, the Getty Center, in Los Angeles, to work on a biography of Sam Wagstaff, the curator, collector, and patron of Robert Mapplethorpe, for the publisher W. W. Norton/Liveright, a project he began in 2009.

In 2002, he and Press commissioned the architect, Michael Bell, to build a house for them in New York State's Hudson Valley. The Gefter-Press House, completed in 2007, is included in the book, American Masterworks: Houses of the Twentieth and Twenty First Centuries (Rizzoli), by the architectural historian, Kenneth Frampton.

Gay rights
Beginning in the early 1970s, Gefter was active in the gay rights movement, in the Gay Activists Alliance; Gay Academic Union; and Gay Media Coalition. He coauthored and was a subject of a book about his same-sex relationship, Lovers: The Story of Two Men (Avon, 1979). In 1981, he was a founding member of the Gay Men's Health Crisis, formed in Larry Kramer's living room when the earliest cases of HIV/AIDS (still then yet to be named) were reported. In 1991, he was a founding member of the New York chapter of the National Lesbian and Gay Journalists Association, serving as chapter president from 1993 to 1995.

Publications

Publications by Gefter 
Photography After Frank (New York: Aperture, 2009) 
Wagstaff: Before And After Mapplethorpe (New York: Liveright, 2014) 
George Dureau: The Photographs (New York: Aperture, 2016) 
What Becomes a Legend Most: A Biography of Richard Avedon (New York: Harper, 2020)

Publications with others
Lovers: The Story of Two Men (Avon Books, 1979)

Publications with contributions by Gefter 
"Introduction," About Face, (San Francisco: Pier 24, 2013)
"Who's American Dream Is It?" Larry Sultan: Here and Home, (Los Angeles: Los Angeles County Museum of Art, 2014)
"Nature Mort," Thomas Ruff, (London: Gagosian Gallery, 2015)
"Flesh and Spirit: Robert Mapplethorpe, Sam Wagstaff and the Gay Sensibility," Robert Mapplethorpe: The Perfect Medium, (Los Angeles: J. Paul Getty Museum, 2016)
"Peter Hujar: Eros, C'est La Vie," Peter Hujar: Speed of Light, (J.P. Morgan Museum and Library; Fundación MAPFRE, 2017)
"View from the Judgment Seat," Aperture Conversations, edited by Melissa Harris (Aperture, 2018)
"Richard Learoyd: The Subject Versus the Figure," Richard Learoyd: 2018-2007, (Fraenkel Gallery and Fundacion MAPFRE, 2019)
"Bill Gedney," William Gedney: A Time of Youth, (Duke University Press, 2020)
"The Subject and the Image," Looking Forward, (San Francisco: Pier 24, 2022)

Awards
2014: Marfield Prize for Wagstaff: Before and After Mapplethorpe
2011: Museum Scholar residency, The J.Paul Getty Museum, Los Angeles

Bibliography
Reports From The Holocaust. St. Martin's Press. 1994. By Larry Kramer. .
The Gay Metropolis. Houghton Mifflin, 1997. By Charles Kaiser. .

References

Living people
Photography critics
American biographers
American male biographers
American gay writers
Year of birth missing (living people)